During the existence of the Union of Soviet Socialist Republics, different governments existed within the Crimean Peninsula. From 1921 to 1936, the government in the Crimean Peninsula was known as the Crimean Autonomous Socialist Soviet Republic and was an Autonomous Soviet Socialist Republic located within the Russian Soviet Federative Socialist Republic; from 1936 to 1945, it was called the Crimean Autonomous Soviet Socialist Republic.

As a result of alleged collaboration with the Germans by Crimean Tatars during World War II, all Crimean Tatars were deported by the Soviet regime and the peninsula was resettled with other peoples, mainly Russians and Ukrainians. The autonomous republic without its titled nationality was downgraded to an oblast within the Russian SFSR on  30 June 1945. It was subsequently transferred to the Ukrainian SSR in 1954. As a result of a state-sanctioned referendum in 1991, it became again an autonomous republic within the Ukrainian SSR, and then within independent Ukraine after 1992.

History

Crimea within the Russian SFSR (1921–1954)

Crimean ASSR of the Russian SFSR (1921–1945) 

On 18 October 1921, the Crimean Autonomous Socialist Soviet Republic was created within the Russian SFSR on the territory of the Crimean Peninsula. It was renamed the Crimean Autonomous Soviet Socialist Republic on 5 December 1936 by the Eighth Extraordinary Congress of Soviets of the USSR.

There were two attempts, both unsuccessful, to establish Jewish autonomy in Crimea. The first attempt, conducted by the Soviet government with the support of the American Jewish Joint Distribution Committee, ended in the creation of the Jewish Autonomous Oblast in Birobidzhan, as the Soviet government feared establishing it in Crimea would provoke antisemitic sentiments. The second attempt, by the Jewish Anti-Fascist Committee between 1943 and 1944, led to the Night of the Murdered Poets and heightened persecution of Jews as Stalin feared the establishment of a Jewish republic in Crimea with American support.

Alfred Frauenfeld was appointed as General Commissar (although it seems that Frauenfeld spent most of his time in Crimea researching the peninsula's Gothic heritage and the actual government was in the hands of Erich von Manstein). During the war, there was also widespread resistance to the German occupation.

In 1944, under the pretext of alleged collaboration of the Crimean Tatars with the Nazi occupation regime, the Soviet government on orders of Joseph Stalin and Lavrentiy Beria deported the Crimean Tatar people from Crimea. Actual collaboration in the military sense had been rather limited, with a recorded 9,225 Crimean Tatars serving in anti-Soviet Tatar Legions and other German formed battalions, 
but there was in fact a surprisingly high degree of co-operation between the occupation government and the local administration; this has been significantly due to Frauenfeld's unwillingness to implement the policy of brutality towards the local population pursued by  Erich Koch, which led to a series of public conflict between the two men. The constitutional rights of the forcibly-resettled Tatars were restored with a decree dated September 5, 1967, but they were not allowed to return until the last days of the Soviet Union.

Crimean Oblast of the Russian SFSR (1945–1954) 
The Crimean ASSR was converted into the Crimean Oblast of the Russian SFSR on June 30, 1945 by a decree of the Presidium of the Supreme Soviet (published as a law on June 25, 1946). It was stripped of its autonomous status as a result of the alleged crimes of Crimean Tatars during World War II.

Crimea within the Ukrainian SSR (1954–1992)

Crimean Oblast of the Ukrainian SSR (1954–1991) 
On 19 February 1954, the oblast was transferred from the Russian SFSR to the Ukrainian SSR jurisdiction, on the basis of "the integral character of the economy, the territorial proximity and the close economic and cultural ties between the Crimea Province and the Ukrainian SSR" and to commemorate the 300th anniversary of Ukraine's union with Russia.

Sevastopol was a closed city due to its importance as the port of the Soviet Black Sea Fleet and was attached to the Crimean Oblast only in 1978.

Crimean ASSR of the Ukrainian SSR (1991–1992) 

On 12 February 1991, the status of Crimea Oblast was changed to that of autonomous republic, the Crimean Autonomous Soviet Socialist Republic,  by the Supreme Soviet of the Ukrainian SSR as the result of a state-sanctioned referendum held on 20 January 1991. 4 months later, on June 19, appropriate changes were made to the Constitution of the Ukrainian SSR.

With effect from 6 May 1992, the Autonomous Soviet Socialist Republic was transformed into the Republic of Crimea within Ukraine. On 21 September 1994 it was renamed as the Autonomous Republic of Crimea by Verkhovna Rada. This name was used for Crimea (with the exception of the city of Sevastopol) in new Ukrainian Constitution of 1996. The status of Sevastopol, due to its strategic importance as the main base of the Russian Black Sea Fleet, remained disputed between Ukraine and Russia until 1997 when it was agreed that it should be treated as a "city with special status" within Ukraine.

Administrative divisions 

With the establishment of the autonomous republic in 1921, Crimea was divided into seven okrugs, which in turn were divided into 20 raions:
 Dzhankoy
 Yevpatoriya
 Kerch
 Sevastopol
 Simferopol
 Feodosiya
 Yalta

In November 1923, the okrugs were abolished and 15 raions were created instead, but in 1924, five of these were abolished. On 30 October 1930, the remaining ten raions were reorganized into 16 new ones, and four cities under direct republican control.  In 1935, 10 new raions were added and one abolished.  In 1937, one more raion was established.  The raions had national status as for Crimean Tatars, Russians, Jews, Germans and Ukrainians. By the beginning of World War II, all of these raions had lost their national status.

Heads of State

Russian SFSR 
Central Executive Committee
 7 November 1921 – August 1924 Yuri Gaven (Janis Daumanis)
 August 1924 – 28 January 1928 Veli İbraimov
 28 January 1928 – 20 February 1931 Memet Qubayev
 20 February 1931 – 9 September 1937 İlyas Tarhan (arrested on September 8, 1937)
 9 September 1937 – 21 July 1938 Abdulcelâl Menbariyev
Supreme Soviet
 21 July 1938 – 18 May 1944 Abdulcelâl Menbariyev (expelled from Crimea in 1944 with the rest of Crimean Tatars)
 18 May 1944 – 30 June 1945 Nadezhda Sachyova (acting)

Ukrainian SSR/Ukraine 
 22 March 1991 – 9 May 1994 Mykola Bahrov

Heads of Government

Chairmen of Revkom 
 16 November 1920 – 20 February 1921 Béla Kun
 20 February 1921 – 7 November 1921 Mikhail Poliakov (become the one of NKVD troika)

Council of People's Commissars 
 11 November 1921 – 16 May 1924 Sakhib-Garey Said-Galiyev
 16 May 1924 – May 1924 I. Goncharov (acting)
 May 1924 – 21 March 1926 Osman Deren-Ayerly
 21 March 1926 – May 1929 Emir Shugu
 May 1929 – 16 September 1937 Abduraim Samedinov (arrested September 17, 1937)
 1937 – 5 April 1942 Memet Ibraimov
 5 April 1942 – 18 May 1944 Ismail Seyfullayev (under de facto control of Nazi Germany during 1 September 1942 to 23 October 1943)
 18 May 1944 – 30 June 1945 Aleksandr Kabanov

Council of Ministers 
 22 March 1991 – 20 May 1993 Vitaliy Kurashik

Principal Chekists 
Cheka
 until April 1921 Mikhail Vikhman (later in Chernihiv)
 April 1921 – June 1921 Smirnov
 20 June 1921 – 1921 Fyodor Fomin (transferred to Kiev)
 11 November 1921 – February 1922 Aleksandr Rotenberg
Crimea GPU
 February 1922 – 11 September 1922 Aleksandr Rotenberg
 11 September 1922 – 25 April 1923 Stanislav Redens
Merged GPU
 25 April 1923 – 9 June 1924 Stanislav Redens
 20 May 1924 – 29 July 1925 Sergei Szwarz (transferred to the Special department of the Black Sea Navy)
 1925 Aleksandr Toropkin (transferred to Ural)
 October 1926 – 26 April 1928 Ivan Apeter (transferred to the Special department of the Black Sea Navy)
OGPU
 26 April 1928 – December 1929 Grigoriy Rapoport (transferred to Belarus Military District)
 23 January 1930 – 10 July 1934 Eduard Salins (Eduards Saliņš)
Narkom of State Security
 26 February 1941 – 31 July 1941 Major Grigoriy Karanadze
 5 October 1943 – 5 July 1945 Commissar of the 3rd rank Pyotr Fokin

See also 
 Crimea Regional Committee of the Communist Party of Ukraine
 List of chairmen of the Executive Committee of Crimea

Notes

References

External links

Early Soviet republics
Autonomous republics of the Russian Soviet Federative Socialist Republic
Autonomous republics of the Ukrainian Soviet Socialist Republic

Russian-speaking countries and territories
States and territories established in 1921
States and territories disestablished in 1945
States and territories established in 1991
States and territories disestablished in 1992
Former socialist republics
1921 establishments in Russia
1945 disestablishments in the Soviet Union
1991 establishments in the Soviet Union
1992 disestablishments in Ukraine
Post–Russian Empire states
Political history of Crimea